Ralph E. Erickson (born October 3, 1928) is an American lawyer who served as the 11th Deputy Attorney General of the United States from 1972 to 1973.

Biography
He attended Cornell University and graduated with his A.B. He later attended Harvard Law School, where he obtained his J.D. He was appointed the 11th Deputy Attorney General of the United States.

References

1928 births
Living people
American lawyers
Harvard Law School alumni
Cornell University alumni
Nixon administration personnel
United States Deputy Attorneys General
United States Assistant Attorneys General for the Office of Legal Counsel